Little Swanport is a rural locality and an estuary in the local government area of Glamorgan–Spring Bay in the South-east region of Tasmania. It is especially significant for the Little Swanport language. The 2016 census has a population of 117 for the state suburb of Little Swanport.

History
Little Swanport is a confirmed suburb/locality. The indigenous name for the Little Swanport area was recorded by George Augustus Robinson in 1831 as meaning "place where a moving stream flows into a large estuary surrounded by hills".

Geography
The eastern boundary of Little Swanport is the Tasman Sea. The locality surrounds the estuary of the Little Swanport River and the locality of Pontypool.

Road infrastructure
The A3 route (Tasman Highway) enters from the south and runs through to the north-east.

References

Localities of Glamorgan–Spring Bay Council
Towns in Tasmania